Fjortende Julibreen is a glacier in Haakon VII Land at Spitsbergen, Svalbard. It has a length of about sixteen kilometers, and a total area of about 127 km2. It is located between Reppingen, Løvlandfjellet and Mercantonfjellet to the south, and Casimir-Périerkammen, Forelryggen and Foreltinden to the north, and extends down to Fjortende Julibukta in Krossfjorden. The glacier is named after the National Day of France, the 14 July.

References

Glaciers of Spitsbergen